Fictionist is an EP and the debut major label recording by rock group Fictionist, released digitally on October 18, 2011, in the United States.  It was recorded at June Audio Recording Studios and engineered by Scott Wiley (Neon Trees, Elvis Costello).  All songs were written and produced by Fictionist.

Track listing

Release history

References

External links
 Fictionist official site

2011 EPs
Atlantic Records EPs